Robert E. Cowen (born September 4, 1930) is a senior United States circuit judge of the United States Court of Appeals for the Third Circuit based in Philadelphia. He joined the court in 1987 after being nominated by President Ronald Reagan. Cowen has served in the federal judiciary since 1978.

Early life and education

A native of New Jersey, Cowen graduated from Drake University in 1952 with a Bachelor of Science degree. In 1958, Cowen graduated from Rutgers School of Law–Newark with a Bachelor of Laws. Cowen attended Columbia Law School before leaving to join the Army, where he earned the G.I. Bill, which he needed in order to pay for his education.

Legal career

Cowen began his legal career as a law clerk for New Jersey Superior Court Judge Walter Conklin in the New Jersey Superior Court from 1958 to 1959 before becoming a private practice attorney licensed in the State of New Jersey from 1959 to 1969. Cowen also served as an Assistant county prosecutor for the Essex County, New Jersey Prosecutor's Office from 1969 to 1970 before joining the New Jersey Attorney General's Office as a Deputy state attorney general from 1970 to 1973 before becoming the Director of Ethics and Professional Services in the Administrative Office of the United States Courts for New Jersey from 1973 to 1978.

Federal judicial service

District court service

From 1978 to 1985, Cowen was a United States Magistrate of the United States District Court for the District of New Jersey. Cowen was nominated by President Ronald Reagan on October 7, 1985 to the United States District Court for the District of New Jersey, to a new seat created by 98 Stat. 333 which was approved by Congress. Cowen was confirmed by the United States Senate on November 1, 1985 on a Senate vote and received commission on November 4, 1985. Cowen left the District of New Jersey on November 16, 1987, due to his appointment to the Third Circuit Court of Appeals.

Court of appeals service

Less than two years later, Cowen was nominated by President Ronald Reagan on August 7, 1987, to a seat on the United States Court of Appeals for the Third Circuit vacated by Judge James Hunter III as Hunter assumed senior status. Cowen was confirmed by the Senate on November 6, 1987 on unanimous consent of the Senate and received commission on November 9, 1987. Cowen served 11 years before assuming senior status on September 4, 1998. Cowen assumed inactive status on April 1, 2022. He resumed active status briefly in July 2022 for the purpose of resolving J. M. v. Summit City Board of Education.

References

External links
 

1930 births
20th-century American judges
Drake University alumni
Judges of the United States Court of Appeals for the Third Circuit
Judges of the United States District Court for the District of New Jersey
Lawyers from Newark, New Jersey
Living people
Rutgers School of Law–Newark alumni
United States court of appeals judges appointed by Ronald Reagan
United States district court judges appointed by Ronald Reagan
United States magistrate judges